Santullano may refer to:

 Santullano (Las Regueras), a parish in northern Spain
 Santullano, a village in Mieres, Asturias, northern Spain
 Santullano (Salas), a parish in northern Spain
 San Julián de los Prados or Santullano, a church in Oviedo, Spain